Bishop School may refer to:

 Bishop School (Detroit)
 Bishop School (Waterbury, Connecticut)